Polaria is a genus of sea slugs, specifically aeolid nudibranchs, marine gastropod molluscs in the family Paracoryphellidae.

Species 
Species within the genus Polaria are as follows:
 Polaria polaris (Volodchenko, 1946)

References

Paracoryphellidae